The 2014 All-Big 12 Conference football team consists of American football players chosen as All-Big 12 Conference players for the 2014 Big 12 Conference football season.  The conference recognizes two official All-Big 12 selectors: (1) the Big 12 conference coaches selected separate offensive and defensive units and named first- and second-team players (the "Coaches" team); and (2) a panel of sports writers and broadcasters covering the Big 12 also selected offensive and defensive units and named first- and second-team players (the "Media" team).

Offensive selections

Quarterbacks
 Trevone Boykin, TCU (Coaches-1; Media-1)
 Bryce Petty, Baylor (Coaches-2; Media-2)
 Jake Waters, Kansas State (Coaches-2)

Running backs
 Samaje Perine, Oklahoma (Coaches-1; Media-1)
 Shock Linwood, Baylor (Coaches-2; Media-1)
 Malcolm Brown, Texas (Coaches-2)
 Aaron Green, TCU (Coaches-2)
 DeAndré Washington, Texas Tech (Coaches-2)

Fullbacks
 Glenn Gronkowski, Kansas State (Coaches-1)
 Aaron Ripkowski, Oklahoma (Coaches-2)

Centers
 B. J. Finney, Kansas State (Coaches-1; Media-1)
 Joey Hunt, TCU (Coaches-2; Media-2)

Guards
 Mark Glowinski, West Virginia (Coaches-2; Media-1)
 Cody Whitehair, Kansas State (Coaches-2)
 Adam Shead, Oklahoma (Coaches-2)

Tackles
 Le'Raven Clark, Texas Tech (Coaches-1; Media-1)
 Spencer Drango, Baylor (Coaches-1; Media-1)
 Daryl Williams, Oklahoma (Coaches-1; Media-1)
 Tyrus Thompson, Oklahoma (Coaches-1; Media-2)
 Halapoulivaati Vaitai, TCU (Coaches-2)

Tight ends
 E. J. Bibbs, Iowa State (Coaches-1; Media-1)
 Jimmay Mundine, Kansas (Coaches-2; Media-2)

Receivers
 Tyler Lockett, Kansas State (Coaches-1; Media-1)
 Kevin White, West Virginia (Coaches-1; Media-1)
 Corey Coleman, Baylor (Coaches-2; Media-1)
 Sterling Shepard, Oklahoma (Coaches-1; Media-2)
 Curry Sexton, Kansas State (Coaches-2; Media-2)
 Josh Doctson, TCU (Coaches-2)
 John Harris, Texas (Media-2)

Defensive selections

Defensive linemen
 Andrew Billings, Baylor (Coaches-1; Media-1)
 Malcom Brown, Texas (Coaches-1; Media-1)
 Shawn Oakman, Baylor (Coaches-1; Media-1)
 Emmanuel Ogbah, Oklahoma State (Coaches-1; Media-1)
 Ryan Mueller, Kansas State (Coaches-1; Media-2)
 Chucky Hunter, TCU (Coaches-2; Media-2)
 Jordan Phillips, Oklahoma (Coaches-2; Media-2)
 Cedric Reed, Texas (Coaches-2; Media-2)
 Chuka Ndulue, Oklahoma (Coaches-2)
 Pete Robertson, Texas Tech (Coaches-2)

Linebackers
 Paul Dawson, TCU (Coaches-1; Media-1)
 Ben Heeney, Kansas (Coaches-1; Media-1)
 Eric Striker, Oklahoma (Coaches-1; Media-1)
 Pete Robertson, Texas Tech (Media-1)
 Bryce Hager, Baylor (Coaches-2; Media-2)
 Jordan Hicks, Texas (Coaches-2; Media-2)
 Jonathan Truman, Kansas State (Coaches-2; Media-2)
 Dominique Alexander, Oklahoma (Media-2)

Defensive backs
 Chris Hackett, TCU (Coaches-1; Media-1)
 Zack Sanchez, Oklahoma (Coaches-1; Media-1)
 Sam Carter, TCU (Coaches-2; Media-1)
 Randall Evans, Kansas State (Coaches-1)
 Orion Stewart, Baylor (Media-1)
 Quandre Diggs, Texas (Coaches-2; Media-2)
 Karl Joseph, West Virginia (Coaches-1; Media-2)
 JaCorey Shepherd, Kansas (Coaches-1; Media-2)
 Dante Barnett, Kansas State (Coaches-2)
 Danzel McDaniel, Kansas State (Coaches-2)
 Nigel Tribune, Iowa State (Media-2)
 Kevin White, TCU (Coaches-2)

Special teams

Kickers
 Josh Lambert, West Virginia (Coaches-2; Media-1)
 Jaden Oberkrom, TCU (Coaches-1; Media-2)

Punters
 Trevor Pardula, Kansas (Coaches-1; Media-1)
 Spencer Roth, Baylor (Coaches-2; Media-2)

All-purpose / Return specialists
 Tyler Lockett, Kansas State (Coaches-1; Media-2)
 Tyreek Hill, Oklahoma State (Coaches-2; Media-1)

Key
Bold = selected as a first-team player by both the coaches and media panel

Coaches = selected by Big 12 Conference coaches

Media = selected by a media panel

See also
2014 College Football All-America Team

References

All-Big 12 Conference
All-Big 12 Conference football teams